François Mersch (9 June 1913 – 15 February 1983) was a Luxembourgian sprinter. He competed in the men's 100 metres at the 1936 Summer Olympics.

References

1913 births
1983 deaths
Athletes (track and field) at the 1936 Summer Olympics
Luxembourgian male sprinters
Luxembourgian male long jumpers
Olympic athletes of Luxembourg
Sportspeople from Luxembourg City